Nizhny Ingash is an urban-type settlement and the administrative center of Nizhneingashsky District, Krasnoyarsk Krai, Russia. Train station on the line Ingashskaya Krasnoyarsk - Taishet. It had population 7460 inhabitants in 2007. The settlement was founded in 1775. Town status was given since 1961.

References 

Cities and towns in Krasnoyarsk Krai
Nizhneingashsky District